The Twain Shall Meet is the second album by Eric Burdon & the Animals. It was released in 1968 on MGM Records.

Background
The record includes "Sky Pilot", an anti-war song of the Vietnam War era, and "Monterey", the band's tribute to the 1967 Monterey Pop Festival. Reviewer Bruce Eder of AllMusic describes the song "All Is One" as "unique in the history of pop music as a psychedelic piece, mixing bagpipes, sitar, oboes, horns, flutes, and a fairly idiotic lyric, all within the framework of a piece that picks up its tempo like the dance music from Zorba the Greek while mimicking the Spencer Davis Group's "Gimme Some Lovin'.

The Twain Shall Meet reached the #78 position on the U.S. Billboard album chart.

Track listing

Side one
 "Monterey" (4:18)
 "Just the Thought" (3:47)
 "Closer to the Truth" (4:31)
 "No Self Pity" (4:50)
 "Orange and Red Beams" (3:45)

Side two
 "Sky Pilot" (7:27)
 "We Love You Lil" (6:48)
 "All Is One" (7:45)

All selections written by Eric Burdon, Vic Briggs, John Weider, Barry Jenkins, & Danny McCulloch except "Orange and Red Beams", written by McCulloch.

Personnel
Eric Burdon - vocals (1, 3, 4, 6, 8)
John Weider - guitar, violin
Vic Briggs - guitar
Danny McCulloch - bass, vocals (2, 5)
Barry Jenkins - drums

References 

The Animals albums
Eric Burdon albums
1968 albums
Albums produced by Tom Wilson (record producer)
MGM Records albums